Weyher in der Pfalz is a municipality in Südliche Weinstraße district, in Rhineland-Palatinate, western Germany with a stable population of around 500, populated for over 1200 years. It is situated in the foothills of a chestnut tree forest, overlooking the Rhine valley. It is known for its wine production and there are holiday apartments in the village. Ludwig I of Bavaria kept a summer apartment in the cliffs directly overlooking the village, which opens quarterly for village celebrations.

References

Municipalities in Rhineland-Palatinate
Palatinate Forest